Sohail Mahmoud (born 12 April 1996) is a South African cricketer. He was included in the KZN Inland squad for the 2016 Africa T20 Cup. In September 2018, he was named in KwaZulu-Natal Inland's squad for the 2018 Africa T20 Cup.

References

External links
 

1996 births
Living people
South African cricketers
KwaZulu-Natal Inland cricketers
Cricketers from Durban